"Alyosha the Pot" ( [Alyosha Gorshok]) is a short story written by Leo Tolstoy (1905) about the life and death of a simple, uncomplaining worker. It was published after Tolstoy's death in 1911 and received high praise from Tolstoy's contemporaries. D. S. Mirsky considered it "a masterpiece of rare perfection." Without ever calling Alyosha a holy fool, Tolstoy centers the story on his meekness, aloofness, and foolishness. Alyosha's simple life, soft-spoken manner, and calm acceptance of death epitomizes Tolstoyan principles.

History
The hero and namesake of the story was based on a real person. According to the memoirs of Tatyana Andreevna Kuzminskaya (Lev Tolstoy's sister-in-law), "the assistant to the cook and yard-keeper was the half idiot Alyosha the Pot, who was, for some reason, romanticized to the point that reading about him, I could not recognize our holy fool Alyosha. But, as far as I remember, he was quiet, inoffensive, and meekly did all that was ordered of him."

Synopsis

Alyosha is a young child who lives in a village and obtained the nickname "the Pot" from an incident where he broke a pot in his youth. At 19, his father sends him to live with a merchant's family as a servant. As the family begins to assign him all of the housework and errands, he does everything without complaint. Alyosha's father collected his salary, but Alyosha got to keep the occasional tip. Alyosha spoke very little, was not educated, and did not know formal prayers—instead, he prayed with his hands, crossing himself. After a year and a half, Alyosha began to feel that the cook, Ustinia, took pity on him. "He felt for the first time in his life that he--not his services, but he himself--was necessary to another human being". Alyosha falls in love with Ustinia and eventually asks her to marry him, but his father forbids it. Alyosha agrees and ceases to discuss marriage with Ustinia. For the first and only time in the story, Alyosha breaks his lighthearted, laughing demeanor and cries.

Later during Lent, Alyosha falls while he clears snow from the roof. On the third day, he died quietly, having calmly accepted his impending death. "He lay in wonderment, then stretched himself, and died."

See also

Bibliography of Leo Tolstoy
Tolstoyanism

References

External links

az.lib.ru 

Short stories by Leo Tolstoy